Neomphalus is a genus of sea snails, marine gastropod mollusks in the family Neomphalidae.

Species
Species within the genus Neomphalus include:

 Neomphalus fretterae McLean, 1981

References

Neomphalidae
Monotypic gastropod genera